Adam Daniel Galinsky (born 1969) is an American social psychologist known for his research on leadership, power, negotiations, decision-making, diversity, and ethics. He is Vikram S. Pandit Professor of Business and Chair of Management Division at Columbia Business School.

With Maurice Schweitzer, he is co-author of Friend and Foe: When to Cooperate, When to Compete, and How to Succeed at Both (2015).

Early life and education
Adam Galinsky is the son of Dr. David Galinsky and Dr. Maeda Galinsky, long-time professors of psychology and social work,  respectively, at University of North Carolina.  In high school, he lived with a family in Indonesia. His twin brother is the documentary filmmaker Michael Galinsky. Adam has collaborated with his brother as a producer on Michael's films.

Galinsky graduated cum laude with a B.A. in Psychology from Harvard University. He received his M.A. and PhD in Social Psychology from Princeton University.

Academic research and teaching
Prior to moving to Columbia Business School, Professor Galinsky's positions included Assistant Professorship of Management at David Eccles School of Business at the University of Utah and serving as Morris and Alice Kaplan Professor of Ethics and Decision in Management.

Galinsky has published more than 190 scientific articles, chapters, and teaching cases in the fields of management and social psychology. As of April 15, 2015, his h-index was 56 and his i10-index was 117, with 12,322 citations.

Awards and recognition
Galinsky twice won the Chair's Core Course teaching award at Kellogg for teaching excellence on the topic of leadership. He also received a teaching award at Princeton University. In 2011, Professor Galinsky received the Ver Steeg Distinguished Research Fellow at Northwestern University, which is awarded to only one faculty member each year across the university.

Friend and Foe
Adam Galinsky has collaborated with Maurice Schweitzer, Cecilia Yen Koo Professor of Operations and Information Management at the Wharton School at the University of Pennsylvania, to write his first book Friend and Foe: When to Cooperate, When to Compete, and How to Succeed at Both. The book was published by Random House on September 29, 2015.

Editorial reviews

"Galinsky and Schweitzer are star researchers and teachers.  Here they use their talents to bring order to  the often contradictory research on when to cooperate and compete, and they distil their insights into practical tips that anybody can use."
- Chip Heath, co-author of Made to Stick and Switch 

"Friend and Foe is a fascinating voyage through the science of cooperation and competition. Discover why we compare ourselves to our Facebook friends, many gender differences are really due to power differences, and it's usually best to make the first offer in a negotiation."
- Adam Grant, The New York Times bestselling author of Give and Take

"A treasure trove of golden nuggets of information and gem-like insights into the processes that govern social exchange.  We all have to cooperate and compete to succeed.  Friend and Foe provide the best roadmap I've ever seen for doing so—by a mile." - Robert B. Cialdini

Two of the most respected scholars on success explain how you can get along and get ahead. Their guided tour of how to cooperate and how to compete is authoritative, entertaining, and eminently practical! - Angela Duckworth, University of Pennsylvania 

"Should you be cooperative or competitive?  Powerful or submissive?
Hierarchical or flat? Honest or dishonest?  As Galinsky and Schweitzer show in this impressive book, the answer to each of these questions is yes!  They use a wide range of research studies coupled with dozens and dozens of colourful real-life examples to show us that simple answers to complicated questions are not to be trusted and that the secret to success is balance. This book will make you a better colleague, a better negotiator and a better person. - Barry Schwartz, author of /The Paradox of Choice/ and /Practical Wisdom"

"A fascinating read, and an eye-opening look at how we navigate an increasingly complex social world. Meticulously researched, filled with compelling real-world anecdotes, Friend And Foe is a unique and vastly entertaining roadmap to improving relationships and resolving conflicts- at work, at home, and in life." -  Ben Mezrich, NY Times bestselling author of The Accidental Billionaires and Once Upon A Time in Russia

See also
Margaret Ann Neale
Katherine W Phillips
Charles A. O'Reilly III

References

Living people
1969 births
American social psychologists
American male writers
Harvard College alumni
Princeton University alumni
Columbia Business School faculty